Guillaume Jouvenel des Ursins (15 March 1400 - 23 June 1472) was Justice Minister of France from 1445 to 1461 and from 1465 to 1472.

See also
List of Justice Ministers of France

Justice ministers
15th-century French people
1400 births
1472 deaths